Lake Pilchicocha is a „blackwatered“ lake, in the Province of Sucumbíos of Ecuador.

Geography 
Lake Pilchicocha is located in the eastern Ecuadorian Amazon Basin, and about 2.1 Miles (1,3 km) from the Napo River. The fish population consists mainly of Scavenger-Piranhas.

Northeast of the Lake one can find a Wildlife Lodge („Sacha Lodge“), commonly used by birdwatchers and hikers.

See also 
Lake Garzacocha

References

External links 
 Sacha Lodge at adventure-life.com
 The Sacha Lodge

Geography of Sucumbíos Province
Drainage basins of Ecuador
Amazon rainforest
Pilchicocha
Amazonas Region
Amazon basin
Upper Amazon